Events from the year 2016 in Macau, China.

Incumbents
Chief Executive: Fernando Chui
Legislative Assembly President: Ho Iat Seng

Events
17 March - 10th Asian Film Awards

References

 
Years of the 21st century in Macau
2010s in Macau
Macau
Macau